In optics, jitter is used to refer to motion that has high temporal frequency relative to the integration/exposure time.  This may result from vibration in an assembly or from the unstable hand of a photographer.  Jitter is typically differentiated from smear, which has a lower frequency relative to the integration time.  Whereas smear refers to a relatively constant rate during the integration/exposure time, jitter refers to a relatively sinusoidal motion during the integration/exposure time.

The equation for the optical Modulation transfer function associated with jitter is

Note that this frequency is in radians of phase per cycle. The equivalent expression in Hz is

For spacecraft, operation in a vacuum often means low mechanical damping.  Meanwhile, spacecraft are compact and rigid, to withstand high launch loads.  Jitter, then, is transmitted easily and often a limiting factor for high-resolution optics.

References

Science of photography